Alya Nurshabrina Samadikun (born 21 January 1996) is an Indonesian International Relations Ambassador, fashion model, painter, and beauty queen. She represented province of West Java at the Miss Indonesia 2018 pageant, where she won the title and crowned by the Miss Indonesia 2017 titleholder, Achintya Holte Nilsen from West Nusa Tenggara, in the finale held on 22 February 2018. She earned the right to represent Indonesia at the Miss World 2018 pageant in China.

Previously, Alya was a top 40 finalist of GADIS Sampul 2012 and The Face of Femina 2014.

Early life and education 

Alya was born in Bandung on 21 January 1996, daughter of Ina Nuraini and Rudyandi Praditya, and is currently domiciled in Jakarta, the capital city of Indonesia. She is of Javanese and Sundanese descent.

Alya went to SD Islam Dwi Matra (Islamic private elementary school), SMP Bakti Mulya 400 (private middle school) and SMA Negeri 55 Jakarta (public high school).

Alya have said many times that her passion is art. Although she often participated in various academic competitions with her schoolmates, English is the subject she mostly received awards for. In middle school, she began to learn and love fashion as well as performance arts, typically dancing and singing. Due to the nature of Alya, who likes to stay busy, eventually she entered the world of modeling.

To pursue a higher education, Alya moved from Jakarta to Bandung. Alya has a bachelor's degree from Parahyangan Catholic University (UNPAR) Bandung, majoring in International Relations, Faculty of Social and Political Sciences with summa cum laude. During her time in college, Alya was active in the major's student body/organization and was chosen as a lecturing assistant. She assisted Prof. V. Bob Sugeng Hadiwinata, Ph.D. at Parahyangan Cenre for European Studies (PACES) during her 5th Semester, and she assisted Asmadiyanti Dinar at Aesthetics class afterwards. Alya incised a number of achievements during her 4 years pursuing her degree. She represented the university, both as a single delegate or within a delegation team, on many international events abroad. The most notable one was when she was appointed to be the Head Delegate of Parahyangan Catholic University's delegation for Harvard National Model United Nations 2017, held by Harvard University, in Boston, United States. In that competition, her team won the Social Venture Challenge. It was then that Alya and her teammates were rewarded with Resolution Fellowship by the Resolution Project.

Since 2011, Alya has been a coach or motivator at Adam Khoo Learning Technologies Group (AKLTG), an institution from Singapore that provides learning skills and life motivation for teenagers and children. Her job, being a coach at I'm Gifted Camp hosted by the Adam Khoo Organization, acknowledged to provide plenty of space for her to learn many new things about teaching as well as public speaking. Not only that it was an opportunity to motivate the participants consisting of children and adolescents, but also to increase her self-motivation and general outlook upon her own future.

Beyond undergoing activities as a coach/motivator at Adam Khoo and as a freelance fashion model, Alya also likes to fill her spare time with painting, a hobby that she has possessed since her childhood. Alya has even produced a lot of works, which she began to participate in the exhibitions during her time when she lived in Bandung.

Social activities 
Outside her academic and modeling activities, Alya is also active in various social activities and charities. Below are small examples of her participation.

In 2016, she was acting as a volunteer of Chay Ya Nepal with other independent volunteers from Indonesia, where she participated in a school building program in Yamunadanda Village, Sindhupalchok District, Nepal that collapsed after the earthquake that strikes the area in 2015. Specifically, she helped the fundraising and taught art & recycling workshops to the students in the village.  Alya once lined up to be the chairperson of This Is Us! Youth Unite for Autism event, held by the Bandung Youth & Sports Department in 2017. She was also active as a volunteer of the non-profit group Sahabat Peduli Indonesia, co-designing the logo and participated in executing their initiatives in the field of education. She represented the group to teach art, teamwork activiteas and recycled garbage for children around Ngurbloat Beach, Maluku Tenggara in 2017. She is also the co-initiator & illustrator of Kabayan children storybook about recycling plastic wastes.

Pageantry

Wajah Femina 2014 
Alya was successfully crowned as the 1st Winner of Wajah Femina 2014 on the finale which took place at XXI Ballroom Djakarta Theater, Jakarta on Thursday, 4 December 2014. Alya successfully became the winner after setting aside 19 other finalists who were screened from thousands of participants. In this contest, 2nd Winner is won by Astrini Faustina while Meiyola Berlina is crowned as the 3rd Winner.

As the winner of Wajah Femina, Alya is active as a performer in Femina's road show which is held from campus to campus to share her experiences. In addition to the 'road show', one of the most impressive invitations, was when she had the opportunity to represent Femina at the World Wide Views on Climate and Energy public consultation event. Being the finalist of Wajah Femina also adds her confidence. Which helped her in 2015, when Alya got an opportunity to represent her university to attend Melaka International Youth Dialogue held in Melaka, Malaysia.

Miss Indonesia 2018 
Alya represented the province of West Java on Miss Indonesia 2018 pageant. Alya was chosen as Top 16 finalist by winning Beauty with a Purpose fast track event, and went on to win the competition as well. She successfully wowed the jury when the jury chairwoman Liliana Tanoesoedibjo gave a question about her integrity when she faces a test. Alya replied:

After her winning as Miss Indonesia, Alya earn the right to represent Indonesia in Miss World 2018 pageant in China.

References

External links 
 
  Miss Indonesia Official Website

Miss Indonesia winners
1996 births
Indonesian female models
Miss World 2018 delegates
Living people
Javanese people
Sundanese people